Bluebell is a small suburb of Dublin, Ireland. Situated approximately 6 kilometres south-west of the city centre, on the Camac, a Liffey tributary, the suburb borders the Grand Canal and Ballyfermot to the west, Walkinstown & Drimnagh to the east, Inchicore to the north, and Clondalkin to the south.

Bluebell is in the Dublin South-Central Dáil constituency and is administered by Dublin City Council at the local government level. Its postal code is Dublin 12.

History

There is an early reference concerning Bluebell cemetery and church ruins, dated 1254, when the people who lived here were most likely part of the Barnewall's Drimnagh Castle estate and home farm. Bluebell was part of the Civil Parish of Clondalkin. Until the 1950s, Bluebell was mainly a market garden and farming community on the outskirts of the city. It was developed for residential housing by what was then Dublin Corporation in the post-war housing programme, which brought an influx of young families to the area.

Over the years, the area received heavily industrialised development with the coming of paper mills, making use of the Camac River for their water supply. Gradually more industry moved into the area, with companies including Lambs, Roadstone, Nugget, McInerneys, Fiat and Volkswagen.

Amenities

The local post office is located on La Touche Road.  The Roman Catholic Church of Our Lady of the Wayside is one of the larger buildings. It is situated on the Old Naas Road, adjacent to Bluebell Luas stop.
The 91st Dublin Scout Den serves both Bluebell and the neighbouring suburb of Inchicore and meets in the Oblates Fathers facility in Inchicore.  Bluebell has one pub – the Cottage Inn – located on Bluebell Avenue. There are no supermarkets or major shopping centres. Small traders include newsagents, hairdressers and fast food outlets, concentrated on the Old Naas Road near the church.  One primary school, Our Lady of the Wayside, is located on Bluebell Road. The school was opened in 1960. There is also St Cillian's National School.

Local landmarks
There are few local historic landmarks within the area of Bluebell. Bluebell cemetery would be a prime reason to visit the suburb for many people with friends and relatives buried there. A ruined medieval church is located in the cemetery.

In 2008 Local artist and environmentalist Fiann Ó Nualláin begun a project 'Bluebells for Bluebell' the aim to encourage locals to plant their place name. Supported by The railway procurement agency and Dublin city Council, the project has seen the reintroduction of native Irish bluebells into the green verges and public spaces around the bluebell environs. The main attraction being the name stone green facing the luas stop which has been transformed into an urban woodland habitat for bluebells. A striking sight to behold each Easter as the thousands of bluebells bloom.

The dominant style of the area is that of a mid-20th century popular housing development – almost exclusively in deep red brick. The most distinctive buildings of the Bluebell area are that of the local Catholic church, built in an Italianate style with a lighter shade of red brick which contrasts to the dominant dark red of the surrounding residential and commercial buildings.

Bluebell is located near the start of the Naas dual carriageway. The district also borders the Grand Canal.

This project suggests that a better Irish name would be  - the Irish for the Bluebell Flower - rather than the cloigin gorm which suggests a small bell blue in colour. The historical archives do not provide evidence of a coloured bell.

Administration
In administrative terms, Bluebell is in Dublin City Council and in local government elections
is part of the Ballyfermot-Drimnagh Ward. Bluebell is in the Dublin South-Central Dáil constituency.

Famous Names
The Irish traditional music group The Wolfe Tones originated in Bluebell.

External links
  Bluebell Post Office
 Our Lady of the Wayside Church Bluebell
 91st Bluebell & Inchicore Scouts

References

Towns and villages in Dublin (city)
Uppercross